Chu Pou (303 – 1 January 350), courtesy name Jiye, was a Chinese military general and politician of the Eastern Jin. His daughter was Chu Suanzi, the wife of Emperor Kang of Jin and empress dowager to three subsequent emperors. He was at first a mid-level ranking official in the dynasty but held several prominent posts after his daughter became empress. In 349, he led a northern expedition, the first of a series that continued into the 350s. However, the campaign ended disastrously after the Later Zhao commander Li Nong defeated Chu Pou at Dai Slope (代陂, east of present-day Tengzhou, Shandong). Chu Pou died in shame shortly after.

Life

Early life and career 
Chu Pou was from Yangdi County (陽翟, modern Yuzhou, Henan) in Henan Commandery. His grandfather, Chu Lüe (褚䂮), was a reputable man who served as General Who Maintains The East, while Chu Pou's father, Chu Qia (褚洽), served as Prefect of Wuchang. When Chu Pou first entered the government, he served on the staff of the Prince of Xiyang, Sima Yang (司馬羕) and the Prince of Wu, Sima Yue (later known as Emperor Kang of Jin). Chu Pou was Chi Jian's Army Advisor during Su Jun's rebellion in 328, and after it ended, Chu Pou became Marquis of the Capital District. He grew to become Attendant Officer of the Household Gentlemen to the Minister Over The Masses and later transferred to Attendant Gentleman of the Yellow Gate. When Sima Yue was still the Prince of Langya, he married Chu Pou's daughter, Chu Suanzi, and Chu Pou later became the Prefect of Yuzhang (豫章郡; around present-day Nanchang, Jiangxi).

During Emperor Kang and Emperor Mu's reigns 
Emperor Cheng died in 342, and Sima Yue ascended the throne. The now Emperor Kang made Chu Suanzi his empress and summoned her father to Jiankang to make him Palace Attendant and Master of Writing. However, Chu Pou was not keen on accepting his position in the capital, as he feared he would hold too much power for being the empress's father (consort kin). Instead, he requested to be assigned away from the capital, so Emperor Kang had him positioned in Banzhou, where he served as Inspector of Jiangzhou. During his farewell banquet at Banqiao, Sima Wuji (司馬無忌) attempted to assassinate a guest, Wang Qizhi (王耆之), but Chu Pou ordered the guards to restrain him and saved Qizhi.

Despite his insistence to remain away, the court managed to have Chu Pou return to Jiankang in 343. Chu Pou refused to take any more offices in Jiankang, so in 344, he was made Inspector of Yanzhou and set out for Jincheng (金城, in modern-day Yongji, Shaanxi). Emperor Kang died that same year, and Chu Pou's grandson, Emperor Mu of Jin, succeeded him. As the new emperor was still young, He Chong believed that being the empress's father, Chu Pou should involve himself more in the court, so He sent a petition calling for Chu Pou to assist him in the affairs of the Masters of Writing. Chu Pou was showered with many offices and was allowed to retain his old ones, but Chu Pou feared that this would only result in criticism from the other ministers. He asked to receive a border post instead, so the court sent him to Jingkou, where he held command over Xuzhou, Yanzhou, and Qingzhou and two commanderies in Yangzhou.

Chu Pou was again summoned to Jiankang to become Inspector of Yangzhou and chief of affairs of the Masters of Writing. However, he refused to take them and returned to his post after the ministers Liu Xia (劉遐) and Wang Huzhi (王胡之) told him to do so to give Sima Yu more responsibility in the state's affair. In 346, Chu Pou recommended Gu He (顧和) and Yin Hao serve in the Jin administration. Gu He refused, but Yin Hao, after some persuading, agreed.

Northern expedition 
In 349, a military expedition to the north was ripe as Later Zhao descended into civil war between Shi Hu's family after his death. As news reached the south, Chu Pou submitted a petition asking to lead a campaign against Zhao. With readied troops, Chu Pou marched to Sikou (泗口, located at Xuzhou, Jiangsu), where he planned his next move. The court was worried about Chu Pou leading the campaign as they may risk losing a prominent minister. However, his general Wang Yizhi (王頤之) was already on his way to Pengcheng, and he planned to continue into Xiapi. Chu Pou became Grand Commander, and as his men captured Pengcheng, many of the Han Chinese came out and surrendered to him.

The people of Lu Commandery rose against Zhao and asked Chu Pou to help them. Chu Pou sent Wang Kan (王龕) and Li Mai (李邁) to welcome them. The Zhao general, Li Nong, who shared power with Shi Min over the Zhao emperor, Shi Jian, personally led his army and attacked Wang Kan at Dai Slope. Li Nong destroyed the Jin army and killed Wang Kan, prompting Chu Pou to make a panicked retreat to Guangling. Upon hearing Chu Pou's defeat, the commander in Shouchun, Chen Kui (陳逵), burnt down the city and fled.

Death 
Chu Pou's humiliating defeat caused him to request his demotion. The court only ordered him to return to Jingkou and removed him from the position of commander. Many Chinese had openly fled in thousands to the south after hearing Chu Pou had led troops to help them, but after he was defeated, many were defenceless and slaughtered by the Zhao army. Chu Pou arrived at Jingkou and saw many people in mourning. After asking why they were that way, he found out that most of their relatives had died at Dai Slope. Chu Pou felt shame and grew ill because of this. He died on the 1st of January 350 and was posthumously named Marquis Yuanmu of Duxiang.

Family and descendants
Chu Pou was known to have at least 2 wives who predeceased him, Lady Xun and Lady Bian. He had another wife, Lady Xie, who gave birth to his daughter Chu Suanzi in 324. During the reign of his grandson Sima Dan, Chu Suanzi (now empress dowager) received an official petition stating that since Lady Xie had already received a title, Ladies Xun and Bian should be granted titles posthumously as well. Empress Dowager Chu dismissed the petition. 

Chu Pou also had a son, Chu Xin (褚歆). Chu Xin had a son, Chu Shuang (褚爽). Chu Shuang had a daughter, Chu Lingyuan, who was the last empress consort of the Eastern Jin, as the wife of Emperor Gong. Chu Shuang also had at least 3 sons: Xiuzhi (秀之), Yanzhi(炎之) and Yuzhi (喻之).

References 

 Fang, Xuanling (ed.) (648). Book of Jin (Jin Shu).
 Sima, Guang (1084). Zizhi Tongjian.

303 births
350 deaths
Generals from Henan
Jin dynasty (266–420) generals
Jin dynasty (266–420) politicians
Politicians from Henan